Drie Weken Huisknecht  is a 1944 Dutch film directed by Walter Smith.

Cast

Paul Steenbergen	... 	Jonkheer Alfred de Beaucour
Matthieu van Eysden	... 	Kamerdienaar Marcel
Joan Remmelts	... 	Henri de Beaucour
Piet Bron	... 	Gerrit Bolhuis
Coba Kelling	... 	Julia Bolhuis
Wilma van Klaveren	... 	Loes Bolhuis
Richard Flink	... 	Notaris Van Bunschoten
Louise Hiddink		
Jo Vischer Sr.	... 	Kolenhandelaar Van den Burg
Jan Blok	... 	Slager Wolters
Piet te Nuyl Sr.	... 	Wijnhandelaar Winpelman
Henk Bakker	... 	Kleermaker Peitzel

External links 
 

1944 films
Dutch black-and-white films